Johannes von Gmünd is also the name of a 14th-century architect, see Basel Münster.

Johannes von Gmunden (c. 1380/84 – February 23, 1442) was a German/Austrian astronomer, mathematician, humanist and early instrument maker.

Biography
Johannes von Gmunden received the degree of a Master of Arts at the University of Vienna in 1406. From 1408, he was a lecturer at Vienna, lecturing on Aristotle's Physics (1408) and Meteora (1409, 1411), Peter of Spain (1410) and Algorismus de minutiis (1412). He fell seriously ill in 1412.

In 1415 and 1416 studied theology, completing a Bachelor of Theology in 1416. He continued lecturing only in 1419, on algorismus de integris. From 1420, Johannes was permitted to restrict his teaching to the specialized field of the mathematics of astronomy, focusing on Euclid's Elements and the Sphaera materialis of John Holywood. With the aid of students (Weidler's 1741 Historia astronomiae names Georg Pruneck of Ruspach, Georg of Neuenburg, Johannes Schinkel and Johannes Feldner) he compiled voluminous astronomical tables. In 1425, he was elected canon at St. Stephen's Cathedral. Georg von Peuerbach succeeded him at Vienna University in 1450.

John's origins are somewhat disputed. He was probably born in Gmunden, Upper Austria, but there were also suggestions connecting him with Gmünd, Lower Austria, or that he was a Swabian from Schwäbisch Gmünd who studied in Ulm in his youth, based on a document written at Ulm in 1404 by one "Johannes Wissbier de Gamundia".

Legacy
Asteroid 15955 Johannesgmunden is named after him.

Works
Astrolabii qui primi mobilis motus deprehendur canones (1515)

See also
List of Roman Catholic scientist-clerics

Notes

References 
John Mundy, John of Gmunden, Isis, The History of Science Society (1943).

Further reading
P. Uiblein, Johannes von Gmunden, in: Beiträge zur Wiener Diözesangeschichte 15, 1974
E. Prillinger (Hrsg.): Die Zeit kommt vom Himmel: von der Astronomie zum Kalender. Zum Gedächtnis Johannes von Gmunden, 1384-1442, 1984.
Helmuth Grössing: "Johannes von Gmunden in seiner Zeit, In: Mitteilungen der Österreichischen Gesellschaft für Geschichte der Naturwissenschaften'' 3-4 (1985) pp. 66-72
Ralf Kern. "Wissenschaftliche Instrumente in ihrer Zeit", Band 1: "Vom Astrolab zum mathematischen Besteck". p. 197.

1380 births
1442 deaths
People from Gmunden
15th-century Austrian people
Austrian astronomers
15th-century German astronomers
15th-century Austrian mathematicians
15th-century German mathematicians
Austrian expatriates in Germany
Catholic clergy scientists
15th-century German writers